Wilton Cezar Xavier was a Brazilian footballer who achieved notoriety in Brazil after scoring, with his hand and in offside position, a decisive goal for Fluminense in a Fla-Flu match on October 13, 1968. Throughout his career, Wilton also played for São Paulo, Santa Cruz, Coritiba and Vitória. Wilton played for several Campeonato Brasileiro Série A clubs. He died on December 13, 2009 in the city of Volta Redonda, aged 62.

References

Brazilian footballers
Fluminense FC players
São Paulo FC players
Santa Cruz Futebol Clube players
Coritiba Foot Ball Club players
Esporte Clube Vitória players
Clube Náutico Capibaribe players
2009 deaths
1947 births
Association football midfielders
Footballers from Belo Horizonte